Beat by Beat by Beat is a video released by German industrial rock band KMFDM originally released on VHS by the name Beat by Beat in 1997 and on DVD with its final, longer name in 2001.  It features live performances and backstage tour footage from the band's 1995 Beat by Beat tour as well as all seven of the band's videos produced at the time.

Track list
Megalomaniac (Video)
Intro
Flesh (Live)
Behind The Scenes Footage
Disobedience (Live)
A Drug Against War (Video)
Money (Video)
Behind The Scenes Footage
More & Faster (Live)
More & Faster (Video)
Son Of A Gun (Video)
Behind The Scenes Footage
Vogue (Video)
Juke-Joint Jezebel (Manga) (Video)
Behind The Scenes Footage
Godlike (Live)
Behind The Scenes Footage
End Titles/Sascha Playing Guitar
Naïve (Video)

Personnel
En Esch - vocals, percussion, guitars
Sascha Konietzko - vocals, percussion, keyboards
Günter Schulz - guitars
Raymond Watts - vocals, guitars
Mike Jensen - guitars
Jennifer Ginsberg - backing vocals
Mark Durante - guest guitars

References

KMFDM video albums
1997 live albums
Live video albums
1997 video albums
TVT Records video albums
Wax Trax! Records video albums